Na Sabaeng is a sub-district (tambon) in Si Wilai District, in the heart of Bueng Kan Province, northeastern Thailand. As of 2010, it had a population of 6188 people, with jurisdiction over nine villages.

Phu Thok, the emblematic mountain of the province, is in this sub-district.

References

Tambon of Bueng Kan province
Populated places in Bueng Kan province
Si Wilai District